The 2009–10 East Midlands Counties Football League season was the second in the history of East Midlands Counties Football League, a football competition in England.

League

The league featured 17 clubs from the previous season, along with three new clubs:
Anstey Nomads, promoted from the Leicestershire Senior League
Gresley, reformed club
Radcliffe Olympic, promoted from the Central Midlands Football League

League table

References

External links
 East Midlands Counties Football League official site

2009–10
10